Jon Scales (born 28 July 1974) is an English former rugby league and rugby union footballer who played in the 1990s and 2000s.

Career
Scales started his career in rugby union with Newcastle Gosforth before switching to rugby league to sign for Leeds in March 1993. He failed to establish a place in the first team, and moved to the Bradford Bulls in 1995. In 1996, he scored a hat trick in the Challenge Cup semi final in a 28–6 victory over former club Leeds. He also scored in the final against St. Helens but the team went on to lose 32–40. He left the club at the end of the 1998's Super League III, and switched back to rugby union to play for Leeds Tykes. He later had a spell playing rugby union in France.

In 2000, he spent a month on trial at Halifax Blue Sox, but made just one first team appearance before being released. He returned to rugby union to play for Sedgley Park.

References

1974 births
Living people
Bradford Bulls players
English rugby league players
English rugby union players
Halifax R.L.F.C. players
Leeds Rhinos players
Leeds Tykes players
Newcastle Falcons players
Rugby league players from Leeds
Rugby league wingers
Rugby union players from Leeds
Rugby union wings